P with acute (majuscule: Ṕ, minuscule: ṕ) is a letter of the Latin alphabet formed by addition of the acute diacritic over the letter P. It is used in Washo, Chimane alphabet by Wayne Gill, and in the ISO 9 romanization of Abkhaz language. In the past, it was used in Lower Sorbian and Polish.

Usage 
In Washo, it represents the bilabial ejective stop ([pʼ]) sound.

In the ISO 9 romanization of Abkhaz language, the letter replaces pe with middle hook (majuscule: Ҧ, minuscule: ҧ), which is pronounced as aspirated voiceless bilabial plosive ([pʰ]) sound.

The letter appeared in the alphabet made by Jan Kochanowski for Polish language, that was used from 16th until 18th century. It represented the palatalized voiceless bilabial plosive (pʲ) sound.

References

Bibliography 
ISO 9: 1995. Information et documentation — Translittération des caractères cyrilliques en caractères latins — Langues slaves et non slaves, Organisation internationale de normalisation, 1995.
Georg Kral, Grammatik der Wendischen Sprache in der Oberlausitz, Bautzen, M. Schmaler, 1895.
Josef Páta, Krátká příručka hornolužické srbštiny stručná mluvnice, rozhovory a korespondence, Prague, Adolf Černy, 1920.
C. T. Pfuhl, Laut- und Formenlehre der oberlausitzisch-wendischen Sprache : mit besonderer Rücksicht auf das Altslawische, Bautzen, M. Schmaler, 1895.
Jeanette Sake, A Grammar of Mosetén, Berlin/New York, Mouton de Gruyter, 2004, 504 p.

Latin letters with diacritics
Polish letters with diacritics